The Brabus Bullit is an automobile designed and made by Brabus.

BRABUS Bullit (2007?–)

Based on the Mercedes-Benz C-Class W 204 series sedan, the Bullit includes metal catalysts with low back pressure, a custom stainless-steel exhaust system, new engine electronics with custom mapping and on-board diagnostics system, ARAL Synthetic motor oil, redesigned front carbon fiber apron, a three-piece carbon fiber rear spoiler, carbon fiber rear apron with integrated diffuser, aluminum hood with ventilation slots, BRABUS rocker panels, aluminum fender flares front and back, YOKOHAMA ADVAN 265/30 ZR 19 front and 285/30 ZR 19 tires, BRABUS Monoblock S 9.5Jx19 front and 10Jx19 rear light-alloy wheels, height-adjustable BRABUS coil-over suspension with ten selectable settings each, sport sway bars,  vented and grooved steel front brake discs with 12-piston aluminum fixed front calipers,  vented and grooved steel rear brake discs with 6-piston aluminum fixed rear calipers, Mastik and Nubuk interior leather upholstery, carbon-fiber rear seat covers, carbon-fiber components on dashboard, center console and door panels; sport steering wheel and aluminum pedals and shifter.

The vehicle was unveiled at the 2007 Frankfurt Motor Show.

The vehicle went on sale for 348,000 euros.

BRABUS Bullit Black Arrow (2008–)
Based on the BRABUS BULLIT, the Bullit Black Arrow includes a matte-black body colour, BRABUS Monoblock S 9.5J×19 front and 10J×19 rear light-alloy wheels finished in matte-black and an option of YOKOHAMA or Pirelli 265/30 ZR 19 front and 285/30 ZR 19 rear tires.

The vehicle went on sale for 348,000 euro (US$542,549.60).

Engine

The engine was modified from a 5.5L V12 engine block (Mercedes-Benz M275). Emission is EURO IV compliant.

Performance

BRABUS BULLIT Coupé 800 (2012–)

Based on the Mercedes-Benz C-Class coupe, it includes height-adjustable Bilstein coil-over suspension with ten settings, upgraded anti-roll bars, carbon-fiber lower spoilers in the front and rear, tail wing, BRABUS Monoblock R wheels (20×8.5-inch front, 20×9.5-inch rear), Continental/Pirelli/YOKOHAMA 235/30 ZR 20 and 275/25 ZR 20 tires,  vented and grooved steel front brake discs with 12-piston aluminum fixed front calipers,  vented and grooved steel rear brake discs with six-piston aluminum fixed rear calipers, black leather and Alcantara interior upholstery with red contrasting seams, carbon-fiber interior trim on the dashboard, center console and door trim; BRABUS sport steering wheel, aluminum pedals and shifter and MOTUL synthetic motor oil.

The vehicle was unveiled at the 2012 Geneva Motor Show.

The vehicle went on sale for €378,000 (US$495,000), with vehicles built from C 63 AMG Black Series being lighter than the other C-Class coupes.

Engine

The engine was modified from a 5.5L V12 engine block (Mercedes-Benz M275?). Emission is EURO V-compliant.

Transmission
All models include a reinforced, seven-speed quick-shift automatic gearbox as well as a BRABUS limited-slip differential with a locking rate of 40 percent.

Performance

See also 
 Brabus CV 8
 Brabus Rocket
 Mercedes C-Class
 Mercedes CLS

References

External links

 BRABUS page: BRABUS Bullit, BRABUS Bullit Coupé 800

Brabus vehicles
Cars of Germany